Boing is the brand name used by the International division of Warner Bros. Discovery co-owned by Mediaset for a collection of television networks outside of the United States that target children.

As of 2021, Boing-branded channels exist in Italy (its flagship service), France, Spain, and in Africa, while a weekend morning programming block formerly aired on the WarnerMedia-owned Chilevisión (now owned by Paramount Global) in Chile and tv2 in Turkey (previously TNT).

Broadcast

Italy 

The Italian free-to-air television channel marketed at children and teenagers, owned by Boing S.p.A., a joint venture of Fininvest's MFE - MediaForEurope (through its Mediaset Italia subsidiary) and Warner Bros. Discovery (through its International division). It is available on digital terrestrial television and free-to-air satellite provider Tivùsat.

Spain 

The Spanish free-to-air television channel launched in 2010 and owned as a joint venture between Mediaset España and Warner Bros. Discovery through its International unit. Series on the channel are also available in English via a secondary audio feed. Additional feeds are available in Italy, France and Sub-Saharan Africa.

France 

The French pay television channel aimed at children and teenagers launched on 8 April 2010. On 2 February 2023, it was announced that Boing would transition to Cartoonito full-time on 3 April 2023.

Africa 

The African television channel operated by Warner Bros. Discovery through its International unit, which launched on May 30, 2015. At this moment, the channel can be seen on Montage Cable TV in Nigeria and Sentech's Mobile TV in South Africa. On January 1, 2017, the channel became available to AzamTV subscribers. The channel does not have a website. The French version of Boing is also broadcast in Sub-Saharan Africa and the Maghreb.

The Animadz
A group of characters known as the Animadz serve as Boing's official mascots. They include Bo, a blue dog-like human; Bobo, a hairless green humanoid; Otto, a robot; Maissa, a yellow maize; Katrina, a whit, Boomerang, Dino, a green dinosaur.

See also
 Cartoon Network (international channels)
 Boomerang
 Cartoonito
 Pogo
 Tooncast

References

External links 
 Boing Italy 
 Boing France 
 Boing Spain 

 
Cartoon Network
Boomerang (TV network)
Cartoonito
Children's television networks
Warner Bros. Discovery EMEA
Warner Bros. Discovery brands